Nicole Diar, born July 21, 1975, is an American woman convicted of the August 27, 2003 murder of her 4-year-old son, Jacob. Prosecutors argued that Diar suffocated her son before setting the house on fire, though the exact cause of Jacob's death was never determined because his body was too badly burned. The jury sentenced her to death. In 2008, the Ohio Supreme Court upheld her conviction but overturned the sentence on the basis that the jury was not informed that a single vote could prevent her from receiving the death penalty.  On June 3, 2010, she was sentenced to life in prison without parole.

Nicole Diar was convicted in 2005 of charges she killed her 4-year-old son, Jacob Diar. Jacob Diar's burned remains were found inside of their house in Lorain, Ohio after a house fire that occurred in 2003. Nicole Diar was able to run out of the house to safety but her son was left inside. Diar claimed she tried to save her son from his upstairs bedroom but the smoke was too much. The officers that morning said Diar did not have any soot or smell strongly of smoke as she would if she had tried to save her son during the fire. Jacob's autopsy could not determine cause of death but did suggest that he died before the fire was started due to the lack of soot and evidence of smoke inhalation in his lungs. Judge Kosma Glavas sentenced Diar to the death penalty after it was suggested by the Ohio jury in October 2005. The Ohio Supreme Court overturned her death sentence in 2008 because the Jury was not told ahead of time that just one of them could have changed her death sentence by refusing to consider execution. Diar suggested a bargain to prosecutors where she agreed to spend her life in prison and avoid future legal challenges if her death sentence is overturned.

Nicole Diar herself was a burn victim from the age of 4. She suffered burns when her nightgown caught fire and ended up going through a total of 61 surgeries until she was 18. From this, she continued to receive a sum every month of $3,000 from a lawsuit against the pajama company.

Diar would often leave Jacob at home with young, teen babysitters so she could go out to bars and parties for the night. One babysitter, Luis Agosto, recalls being told to give Jacob a "medicine for his hyperactivity" so he would get tired and go to sleep decently early. Agosto didn't question it and gave medication to Jacob and his cousin Taylor, daughter of Rebecca Diar. The two friends of Agosto who were also there that night read the label and pointed out that the medication he gave to the children was Tylenol 3 with codeine prescribed to Taylor. When they informed Diar of this incident, she brushed it off and said Jacob would be okay. Destiny Faulkner also babysat Jacob and could also recall being told to give Jacob this medicine on multiple occasions during the summer of 2003. Faulkner only gave Jacob the medication twice when told but did not on the last time because he was not ill. A pharmacist at the trial confirmed that it was a prescription for Taylor Diar of acetaminophen with codeine. The side effects of this medication can cause drowsiness, upset stomach, and nausea.

Nicole and Jacob Diar had been living in an apartment and had recently moved into a rental home in the same town a month prior to the incident. The landlord recalls putting in new smoke detectors and replaced batteries in remaining ones throughout the home before they moved in. On the night of August 26, 2003, Diar wanted to change her locks on her home due to a break-in she told her landlord about. She claimed someone broke into her house and stole the keys and money orders she was supposed to use to pay the rent for that month. Due to that she got help from her neighbor, Leroma Penn, to change her front doorknob lock and add a deadbolt to the backdoor. Diar purposely told Penn to refrain from changing the strike plate on the front door. Although it was sticking, causing trouble opening the door, she wanted to be able to hear if an intruder was trying to get in.

Leroma stayed afterwards to have a couple drinks with Diar at her house and went home at 1:00 am. Leroma stated that as she was leaving, Diar went to lay down on the couch with Jacob who had been sleeping there. Leroma said they made plans to do some shopping together in the morning so she called Diar at about 8:00 am but there was no answer. Leroma then heard Diar screaming about an hour after she tried calling. She ran outside to see what was going on and found Diar screaming in front of her house that her house was on fire and could not find Jacob.

In popular culture

Diar's crimes were profiled on the Investigation Discovery series Deadly Women, episode "Bury Their Babies", originally aired: November 2, 2012.

Also the focus of story 2 of episode 23 of the "Radio Rental" podcast.

See also
 List of women on death row in the United States

References

External links
 State of Ohio v. Nicole Diar, Case no. 2005-2264 video at The Ohio Channel

1975 births
American female criminals
American female murderers
American people convicted of arson
American people convicted of assault
American people convicted of murder
American prisoners sentenced to life imprisonment
Filicides in the United States
Living people
People convicted of murder by Ohio
People from Lorain, Ohio
Prisoners sentenced to death by Ohio